The Butterfly Effect is a 2004 American science fiction thriller film written and directed by Eric Bress and J. Mackye Gruber. It stars Ashton Kutcher, Amy Smart, Eric Stoltz, William Lee Scott, Elden Henson, Logan Lerman, Ethan Suplee, and Melora Walters. The title refers to the butterfly effect.

Kutcher plays 20-year-old college student Evan Treborn, who experiences blackouts and memory loss throughout his childhood. Later, in his 20s, Evan finds he can travel back in time to inhabit his former self during those periods of blackout, with his adult mind inhabiting his younger body. He attempts to change the present by changing his past behaviors and set things right for himself and his friends, but there are unintended consequences for all. The film draws heavily on flashbacks of the characters' lives at ages 7 and 13 and presents several alternative present-day outcomes as Evan attempts to change the past, before settling on a final outcome.

The film had a poor critical reception; however, it was a commercial success, generating box-office revenues of $96 million on a budget of $13 million. The film won the Pegasus Audience Award at the Brussels International Fantastic Film Festival, and was nominated for Best Science Fiction Film at the Saturn Awards and Choice Movie: Thriller in the Teen Choice Awards, but lost to Eternal Sunshine of the Spotless Mind and The Texas Chainsaw Massacre, another film from New Line Cinema, respectively.

Plot

Growing up, Evan Treborn and his friends, Lenny Kagan and Kayleigh Miller, and Kayleigh's brother Tommy, suffered many severe psychological traumas that frequently caused Evan to experience amnesia. These traumas include being forced to take part in pornography by Kayleigh and Tommy's father, George Miller; being nearly strangled to death by his institutionalized father, Jason Treborn, who is then killed in front of him by guards; accidentally killing a mother and her infant daughter while playing with dynamite with his friends; and seeing his dog, Crockett, burned alive by Tommy.

Some time later, while entertaining a girl in his college dorm room, Evan discovers that when he reads from his former journals, he can time travel and redo parts of his past. His time-traveling episodes account for the frequent blackouts he experienced, since those are the moments when his older self occupied his consciousness. After a traumatized Kayleigh commits suicide, he travels back in time and convinces George to never touch her. He comes back to a reality where he and Kayleigh are a happy couple in college. However, George took out his frustrations on Tommy, who grew up to be even more unhinged. Tommy eventually attacks Evan, who kills him in a fit of rage and is sentenced to prison. There, he manages to time travel once more to stop Tommy from killing his dog, but Lenny, who has been bullied by Tommy and become mentally unstable after the dynamite accident, kills Tommy with a metal shard. Evan wakes up in a reality where Lenny has been institutionalized and Kayleigh has become a drug-addicted prostitute. He then travels back to stop the woman and her daughter from being killed with the dynamite, but ends up caught in the explosion himself. In the new reality, Lenny and Kayleigh are a happy couple and Tommy has become religious, but Evan is a double amputee whose mother developed lung cancer after becoming a chain smoker. To save his mother and himself from such a fate, Evan goes back to before the explosion to try and get rid of the dynamite, but accidentally kills Kayleigh in the process.

Evan wakes up in a mental hospital and finds that, in this reality, the journals do not exist and his brain has suffered irreversible damage due to the rigors of time travel. At one point, Evan has a conversation with a doctor who reveals that his father had the same abilities before losing the photographs that allowed him to time jump, causing everyone to believe him to be crazy. Evan ultimately reaches the conclusion that he and his friends will never have good futures as long as he keeps altering the past. 

After escaping the hospital staff and barricading himself in an office, Evan travels back one final time, via the use of an old home movie, to the day he first met Kayleigh. He intentionally upsets her so that she and Tommy will choose to live with their mother in a different neighborhood, instead of with their father when they divorce. As a result, they are not subjected to a destructive upbringing, do not grow up with Evan, Lenny is never bullied, and all go on to have happy, successful lives. Evan awakens in a college dorm room, where Lenny is his roommate. As a test, he asks where Kayleigh is, to which Lenny responds "Who's Kayleigh?" Satisfied that his friends' futures are secure, Evan burns his journals and videos to avoid altering the timeline ever again.

Eight years later in New York City, Evan exits an office building and passes Kayleigh on the street. Despite a brief look towards each other, they both keep walking.

Director's cut
The director's cut features a different ending.

With his brain terribly damaged and aware that he is committed to a psychiatric facility where he will lose access to his time travel ability, Evan makes a desperate attempt to change the timeline by watching a family video, which shows his mother just before she was about to give birth to Evan. Evan travels back to that moment and strangles himself in the womb with his umbilical cord so as to prevent the multi-generational curse from continuing, consistent with an added scene where a psychic palm reader tells Evan "you have no lifeline" and that he does "not belong to this world".

Kayleigh is then seen as a child in the new timeline having chosen to live with her mother instead of her father, and a montage suggests that the lives of the other childhood characters have become loving and less tragic.

Cast

In addition, Callum Keith Rennie plays Jason, Evan's father, while Nathaniel Deveaux plays Dr. Redfield.

Reception

Critical reception
Critical reception for The Butterfly Effect was generally poor. On review aggregator website Rotten Tomatoes, the film holds a 33% approval rating based on 172 reviews; the rating average is 4.8/10. The site's consensus reads: "The premise is intriguing, but it's placed in the service of an overwrought and tasteless thriller." On Metacritic, another review aggregator, it has a score of 30 out of 100 based on 35 reviews, indicating "generally unfavorable reviews". Audiences polled by CinemaScore gave the film an average grade of "B+" on an A+ to F scale.

Roger Ebert wrote that he "enjoyed The Butterfly Effect, up to a point" and that the "plot provides a showcase for acting talent, since the actors have to play characters who go through wild swings." However, Ebert said that the scientific notion of the butterfly effect is used inconsistently: Evan's changes should have wider reverberations. Sean Axmaker of the Seattle Post-Intelligencer called it a "metaphysical mess", criticizing the film's mechanics for being "fuzzy at best and just plain sloppy the rest of the time". Mike Clark of USA Today also gave the film a negative review, stating, "Normally, such a premise comes off as either intriguing or silly, but the morbid subplots (there's prison sex, too) prevent Effect from becoming the unintentional howler it might otherwise be." Additionally, Ty Burr of The Boston Globe went as far as saying, "whatever train-wreck pleasures you might locate here are spoiled by the vile acts the characters commit."

Matt Soergel of The Florida Times-Union rated it 3 stars out of 4, writing, "The Butterfly Effect is preposterous, feverish, creepy and stars Ashton Kutcher in a dramatic role. It's a blast... a solidly entertaining B-movie. It's even quite funny at times..." The Miami Herald said, "The Butterfly Effect is better than you might expect despite its awkward, slow beginning, drawing you in gradually and paying off in surprisingly effective and bittersweet ways," and added that Kutcher is "appealing and believable... The Butterfly Effect sticks to its rules fairly well... overall the film is consistent in its flights of fancy." The Worcester Telegram & Gazette praised it as "a disturbing film" and "the first really interesting film of 2004," adding that Kutcher "carries it off": 

In a retrospective, Peter Bradshaw of The Guardian wrote that critics, including himself, were too harsh on the film at the time of its release.  Describing the film as having been patronized, Bradshaw cited critical disdain for Kutcher as making the film uncool to like.

Box office
The film was a commercial success, earning $17,065,227 and claiming the #1 spot in its opening weekend. Against a $13 million budget, The Butterfly Effect grossed around $57,938,693 at the U.S. box office and $96,060,858 worldwide.

Accolades
2004 Academy of Science Fiction, Fantasy & Horror Films Saturn Award
 Best Science Fiction Film - nominated

2004 Brussels International Festival of Fantasy Film
 Pegasus Audience Award — Eric Bress, J. Mackye Gruber - won

2004 Teen Choice Awards
 Choice Movie: Thriller - nominated

Home media

Release
The film was released on both VHS, as well as DVD as the Infinifilm edition on July 6, 2004. This edition was released with the theatrical cut (113 minutes) on one side and the director's cut (120 minutes) on the other. The DVD also includes two documentaries ("The Science and Psychology of the Chaos Theory" and "The History and Allure of Time Travel"), a trivia subtitle track, filmmaker commentary by directors Eric Bress and J. Mackye Gruber, deleted and alternative scenes, and a short feature called "The Creative Process" among other things.

Alternative endings
The Butterfly Effect has three different endings that were shot for the film:
The theatrical release ending shows Evan passing Kayleigh on the sidewalk, he sees her, and recognizes her, but keeps walking. She also has a brief moment of recognition but also keeps walking.
The "happy ending" alternative ending shows Evan and Kayleigh stopping on the sidewalk when they cross paths. They introduce themselves and Evan asks her out for coffee.
The "open-ended" alternative ending is similar to the one where Evan and Kayleigh pass each other on the sidewalk and keep walking, except this time Evan, after hesitating, turns and follows Kayleigh. This ending was utilized in the film's novelization, written by James Swallow and published by Black Flame.

Sequels
The Butterfly Effect 2 was released on DVD on October 10, 2006. It was directed by John R. Leonetti and was largely unrelated to the original film. It features a brief reference to the first film in the form of a newspaper headline referring to Evan's father, as well as using the same basic time travel mechanics. It received a negative reception from Reel Film Reviews, which called it "An abominable, pointless sequel."

The third installment in the series, The Butterfly Effect 3: Revelations, was released by After Dark Films in 2009. This sequel follows the life of a young man who journeys back in time in order to solve the mystery surrounding his high school girlfriend's death. This film has no direct relation to the first two and uses different time travel mechanics. Reel Film Reviews characterized the third installment as "A very mild improvement over the nigh unwatchable Butterfly Effect 2."

See also
Fetching Cody
Time Freak
Frequency
Erased
Life Is Strange
 List of films featuring time loops
 List of ghost films

References

External links

 
 
 
 
 

2004 films
2004 directorial debut films
2004 psychological thriller films
2004 science fiction films
2000s English-language films
2000s science fiction thriller films
Alternate timeline films
American psychological thriller films
American science fiction thriller films
Films about child sexual abuse
Films about fraternities and sororities
Films about mathematics
Films scored by Michael Suby
Films set in 1989
Films set in 1995
Films set in 2002
Films set in 2010
Films set in a movie theatre
Films set in Manhattan
Films shot in Vancouver
New Line Cinema films
Time loop films
2000s American films